Estonia participated in the Eurovision Song Contest 2013 with the song "Et uus saaks alguse" written by Mihkel Mattisen and Silvia Soro. The song was performed by Birgit. The Estonian broadcaster Eesti Rahvusringhääling (ERR) organised the national final Eesti Laul 2013 in order to select the Estonian entry for the 2013 contest in Malmö, Sweden. The national final consisted of three shows: two semi-finals and a final. Ten songs competed in each semi-final and the top five from each semi-final as determined by a jury panel and public vote qualified to the final. In the final, the winner was selected over two rounds of voting. In the first round, a jury panel and a public vote selected the top two to qualify to the superfinal. In the superfinal, "Et uus saaks alguse" performed by Birgit was selected as the winner entirely by a public vote.

Estonia was drawn to compete in the first semi-final of the Eurovision Song Contest which took place on 14 May 2013. Performing during the show in position 2, "Et uus saaks alguse" was announced among the top 10 entries of the first semi-final and therefore qualified to compete in the final on 18 May. It was later revealed that Estonia placed tenth out of the 16 participating countries in the semi-final with 52 points. In the final, Estonia performed in position 7 and placed twentieth out of the 26 participating countries, scoring 19 points.

Background 

In 2012, "Kuula" performed by Ott Lepland managed to qualify Estonia to the final where the song placed sixth.

The Estonian national broadcaster, Eesti Rahvusringhääling (ERR), broadcasts the event within Estonia and organises the selection process for the nation's entry. ERR confirmed Estonia's participation at the 2013 Eurovision Song Contest on 28 May 2012. Since their debut, the Estonian broadcaster has organised national finals that feature a competition among multiple artists and songs in order to select Estonia's entry for the Eurovision Song Contest. The Eesti Laul competition has been organised since 2009 in order to select Estonia's entry and on 12 September 2012, ERR announced the organisation of Eesti Laul 2013 in order to select the nation's 2013 entry.

Before Eurovision

Eesti Laul 2013 
Eesti Laul 2013 was the fifth edition of the Estonian national selection Eesti Laul, which selected Estonia's entry for the Eurovision Song Contest 2013. The competition consisted of twenty entries competing in two semi-finals on 16 and 23 February 2013 leading to a ten-song final on 2 March 2013. All three shows were broadcast on Eesti Televisioon (ETV) as well as streamed online at the broadcaster's official website err.ee. The final was also broadcast via radio on Raadio 2 as well as streamed online at the official Eurovision Song Contest website eurovision.tv.

Format 
The format of the competition included two semi-finals on 16 and 23 February 2013 and a final on 2 March 2013. Ten songs competed in each semi-final and the top five from each semi-final qualified to complete the ten song lineup in the final. The results of the semi-finals was determined by the 50/50 combination of votes from a professional jury and public televoting. The winning song in the final was selected over two rounds of voting: the first round results selected the top two songs via the 50/50 combination of jury and public voting, while the second round (superfinal) determined the winner solely by public televoting.

Competing entries 
On 12 September 2012, ERR opened the submission period for artists and composers to submit their entries up until 10 December 2012. All artists and composers were required to have Estonian citizenship or be a permanent resident of Estonia. 157 submissions were received by the deadline. An 11-member jury panel selected 20 semi-finalists from the submissions and the selected songs were announced during the ETV entertainment program Ringvaade on 13 December 2012. The selection jury consisted of Owe Petersell (Raadio Elmar chief editor), Lenna Kuurmaa (singer), Erik Morna (Raadio 2 head of music), Alari Kivisaar (Raadio Sky+ program director), Valner Valme (music critic), Ingrid Kohtla (Tallinn Music Week organiser), Siim Nestor (music critic), Koit Raudsepp (Raadio 2 presenter), Maiken (singer), Tauno Aints (composer) and Kaupo Karelson (television producer).

Birgit Õigemeel, Jaan Pehk (member of Kõrsikud), Marilyn Jurman, Rolf Roosalu, Rosanna Lints, Teele Viira and Tenfold Rabbit have all competed in previous editions of Eesti Laul. On 17 December 2012, "Miljoni roosiga kaardi sul saadan", written by Marek Sadam and Peeter Kaljuste and to have been performed by Tauri was disqualified from the competition due to plagiarism and replaced with the song "Young Girl" performed by Armastus. Plagiarism accusations were also launched against the song "Meil on aega veel" performed by Põhja-Tallinn which ERR later declared false.

Semi-final 1
The first semi-final took place on 16 February 2013, hosted by Anu Välba. The live portion of the show was held at the ERR studios in Tallinn where the artists awaited the results while their performances, which were filmed earlier on 8 February 2013, were screened. Ten songs competed for five spots in the final with the outcome decided upon by the combination of the votes from a jury panel and a public televote which registered 17,161 votes. The jury panel that voted in the first semi-final consisted of Lenna Kuurmaa, Valner Valme, Mart Niineste, Ithaka Maria, Owe Petersell, Kadri Voorand, Janek Murd, Olav Osolin, Kristo Rajasaare, Els Himma and Heini Vaikmaa.

Semi-final 2
The second semi-final took place on 23 February 2013, hosted by Marko Reikop. The live portion of the show was held at the ERR studios in Tallinn where the artists awaited the results while their performances, which were filmed earlier on 10 February 2013, were screened. Ten songs competed for five spots in the final with the outcome decided upon by the combination of the votes from a jury panel and a public televote which registered 23,831 votes. The jury panel that voted in the second semi-final consisted of Lenna Kuurmaa, Valner Valme, Mart Niineste, Ithaka Maria, Owe Petersell, Kadri Voorand, Janek Murd, Olav Osolin, Kristo Rajasaare, Els Himma and Heini Vaikmaa.

Final
The final took place on 2 March 2013 at the Nokia Concert Hall in Tallinn, hosted by Anu Välba and Marko Reikop. The five entries that qualified from each of the two preceding semi-finals, all together ten songs, competed during the show. The winner was selected over two rounds of voting. In the first round, a jury (50%) and public televote (50%) determined the top two entries to proceed to the superfinal. In the superfinal, "Et uus saaks alguse" performed by Birgit Õigemeel was selected as the winner entirely by a public televote. The public vote in the first round registered 60,284 votes, and the vote in the superfinal registered 59,347 votes. In addition to the performances of the competing entries, Tanel Padar, who represented Estonia in the Eurovision Song Contest 2001, with Ott Lepland, who represented Estonia in the Eurovision Song Contest 2012, and Jalmar Vabarna, and the bands HU? and Bombillaz performed as the interval acts. The jury panel that voted in the first round of the final consisted of Olav Ehala (maestro), Sandra Nurmsalu (musician), Marten Kuningas (singer), Tõnis Kahu (music critic), Toomas Puna (Raadio Sky+ program director), Sofia Rubina (singer), Owe Petersell (Raadio Elmar chief editor), Reigo Ahven (drummer), Marju Länik (singer), Toomas Olljum (music manager) and Erik Morna (Raadio 2 head of music).

At Eurovision 
According to Eurovision rules, all nations with the exceptions of the host country and the "Big Five" (France, Germany, Italy, Spain and the United Kingdom) are required to qualify from one of two semi-finals in order to compete for the final; the top ten countries from each semi-final progress to the final. The European Broadcasting Union (EBU) split up the competing countries into six different pots based on voting patterns from previous contests, with countries with favourable voting histories put into the same pot. On 17 January 2013, a special allocation draw was held which placed each country into one of the two semi-finals, as well as which half of the show they would perform in. Estonia was placed into the first semi-final, to be held on 14 May 2013, and was scheduled to perform in the first half of the show.

Once all the competing songs for the 2013 contest had been released, the running order for the semi-finals was decided by the shows' producers rather than through another draw, so that similar songs were not placed next to each other. Estonia was set to perform in position 2, following the entry from Austria and before the entry from Slovenia.

The two semi-finals and the final were broadcast in Estonia on ETV with commentary by Marko Reikop. The first semi-final and final were also broadcast via radio on Raadio 2 with commentary by Mart Juur and Andrus Kivirähk. The Estonian spokesperson, who announced the Estonian votes during the final, was Rolf Roosalu.

Semi-final 
Birgit took part in technical rehearsals on 6 and 10 May, followed by dress rehearsals on 13 and 14 May. This included the jury show on 13 May where the professional juries of each country watched and voted on the competing entries.

The Estonian performance featured Birgit performing on stage in a long flowing white dress with the stage projector displaying blue and white patterns before transforming to green colours. Birgit began the performance on the catwalk stage before walking back to the main stage. Birgit was joined by three backing vocalists: Lauri Pihlap, Kaido Põldma and Raimondo Laikre. Pihlap and Põldma had previously represented Estonia as members of 2XL in the Eurovision Song Contest in 2001 together with Tanel Padar and Dave Benton, which they won with the song "Everybody".

At the end of the show, Estonia was announced as having finished in the top 10 and subsequently qualifying for the grand final. It was later revealed that Estonia placed 10th in the semi-final, receiving a total of 52 points.

Final 
Shortly after the first semi-final, a winners' press conference was held for the ten qualifying countries. As part of this press conference, the qualifying artists took part in a draw to determine which half of the grand final they would subsequently participate in. This draw was done in the order the countries appeared in the semi-final running order. Estonia was drawn to compete in the first half. Following this draw, the shows' producers decided upon the running order of the final, as they had done for the semi-finals. Estonia was subsequently placed to perform in position 7, following the entry from Belgium and before the entry from Belarus.

Birgit once again took part in dress rehearsals on 17 and 18 May before the final, including the jury final where the professional juries cast their final votes before the live show. Birgit performed a repeat of her semi-final performance during the final on 18 May. At the conclusion of the voting, Estonia finished in twentieth place with 19 points.

Voting 
Voting during the three shows consisted of 50 percent public televoting and 50 percent from a jury deliberation. The jury consisted of five music industry professionals who were citizens of the country they represent. This jury was asked to judge each contestant based on: vocal capacity; the stage performance; the song's composition and originality; and the overall impression by the act. In addition, no member of a national jury could be related in any way to any of the competing acts in such a way that they cannot vote impartially and independently.

Following the release of the full split voting by the EBU after the conclusion of the competition, it was revealed that Estonia had placed thirteenth with the public televote and eighth with the jury vote in the semi-final. In the public vote, Estonia received an average rank of 10.06, while with the jury vote, Estonia received an average rank of 7.47. In the final, Estonia had placed twenty-fourth with the public televote and sixteenth with the jury vote. In the public vote, Estonia received an average rank of 19.59, while with the jury vote, Estonia received an average rank of 13.41.

Below is a breakdown of points awarded to Estonia and awarded by Estonia in the first semi-final and grand final of the contest, and the breakdown of the jury voting and televoting conducted during the two shows:

Points awarded to Estonia

Points awarded by Estonia

References

2013
Countries in the Eurovision Song Contest 2013
Eurovision